Events from the year 1946 in Scotland.

Incumbents 

 Secretary of State for Scotland and Keeper of the Great Seal – Joseph Westwood

Law officers 
 Lord Advocate – George Reid Thomson
 Solicitor General for Scotland – Daniel Blades

Judiciary 
 Lord President of the Court of Session and Lord Justice General – Lord Normand
 Lord Justice Clerk – Lord Cooper
 Chairman of the Scottish Land Court – Lord Gibson

Events 
 16 March – American Liberty ship Byron Darnton runs aground off Sanda Island; all 54 aboard are rescued.
 13 April – a crowd of 139,468 at Hampden Park, Glasgow, watch the Scotland national football team defeat England 1-0 in a Victory International series Association football match.
 3 May — The Hoover Company opens a factory at Cambuslang.
 10 July – a crowd of 45,000 at Hampden Park watch Jackie Paterson defend his world flyweight boxing title.
 25 July – a train collides with a bus which has crashed through level crossing gates at Balmuckety near Kirriemuir, killing 10.
 27 August – , the first roll-on/roll-off ferry built for service in British waters (the Stranraer–Larne crossing), is launched at William Denny and Brothers' shipyard in Dumbarton.
 22–27 November – the last election for a university constituency in the United Kingdom is held when the Combined Scottish Universities by-election is held. Walter Elliot (Unionist) wins decisively.
 5 December 
 A Kilmarnock by-election results in Willie Ross holding the seat for Labour.
 Scottish edition of the Daily Mail begins publication in Edinburgh.
 Drift mine opened in Machrihanish Coalfield.
 Naturalist Gavin Maxwell purchases the island of Soay, Skye, and attempts to start a commercial shark fishing enterprise there.

Births 
 6 January – John Duignan, economist and writer (died 2019)
 16 January – Graham Masterton, horror author
 30 January – Donald Mackay, Baron Mackay of Drumadoon, Lord Advocate
 28 February – Robin Cook, Labour MP and Foreign Secretary (died 2005)
 12 April – George Robertson, politician, Secretary General of NATO
 May – Jock Brown, solicitor and football commentator
 10 May – Donovan, singer, songwriter and guitarist
 13 May – Bill Torrance, broadcaster
 1 June – Brian Cox, actor
 15 June – Michael Lynch), historian
 9 June – James Kelman, novelist
 9 July – Bon Scott, hard rock musician (AC/DC) in Australia (died 1980 in London)
 10 July – Stuart Christie, anarchist (died 2020)
 16 July – Charles McKean, Professor of Scottish Architectural History (died 2013)
 29 July – Bill Forsyth, film director
 19 August – Christopher Malcolm, television and film actor (died 2014 in London)
 25 August – Gavin Clydesdale Reid, economist
 27 August – Peter Tobin, serial killer and sex offender
 27 October – Margaret Bennett, ethnologist
 6 November – George Young, rock musician in Australia (died 2017)
 18 November
 Andrea Allan, actress
 Chris Rainbow (born Christopher James Harley), pop rock singer and musician (died 2015) 
 14 December – Peter Lorimer, international footballer (died 2021)
 Louise Martin, sports administrator
 Gordeanna McCulloch, folk singer with The Clutha
 Ronald Rae, sculptor

Deaths 
 17 February – Sir George Pirie, painter (born 1863)
 18 February – Catherine Carswell, biographer and journalist (born 1879)
 20 May – Jane Findlater, novelist (born 1866)
 5 June – James Craig Annan, photographer (born 1864)
 14 June – John Logie Baird, television pioneer (born 1888; died in England)
 15 July – Binnie Dunlop, editor and advocate of eugenics (born 1874)
 23 July – James Maxton, MP and leader of the Independent Labour Party (born 1885)
 6 August – Benny Lynch, flyweight boxer (born 1913)
 18 August – Marion Angus, Scots language poet (born 1865 in England)
 9 September – Violet Jacob, historical novelist (born 1863)

Arts and literature 
 22 May – English writer George Orwell leaves London to spend much of the next 18 months at Barnhill, Jura, working on his dystopian novel Nineteen Eighty-Four.
 Summer – Robert McLeish's The Gorbals Story is premiered by Glasgow Unity Theatre at the Queens Theatre.
 Oriel Malet's fictionalised biography of Marjory Fleming is published.
 Janet Adam Smith's Life Among the Scots is published.
 The Central Office of Information short film The Glen is Ours is released.

See also 
 1946 in Northern Ireland
 1946 in Wales

References 

 
Years of the 20th century in Scotland
Scotland
1940s in Scotland